.at is the Internet country code top-level domain (ccTLD) for Austria. It is administered by nic.at.

Second-level domains
The .at top-level domain has a number of second-level domains:

 .ac.at (reserved for academic institutions, especially universities)
 .gv.at (reserved for the government as well as federal and state authorities)
 .co.at (intended for commercially-oriented companies)
 .or.at (intended for all kinds of organizations)
 .priv.at (intended for private Austrian individuals)

However, it is also possible to register directly at the top level. Given the number of English words that end with -at, this presents the possibility for many domain hacks.

Known domain hacks

Many Austrian domain names were registered for English words that end with "at". Domain hacks treating "at" as a word in its own right (such as arrive.at) are widespread. As of today, there are very few such domain names left available on the domain prime market as the result of domain name speculation. Most of them can be bought on the domain secondary market. Only a few of these domain names are actually used. Some known examples of the Austrian domain hacks are:

 donteat.at, a popular Foursquare service
 many.at, link bundler
 hailst.at, official website of Mississippi State Bulldogs athletics

Properties 
An .at-Domain can be between one and 63 characters long. Registrations of internationalized domain names are accepted. In 2007, it was made possible to register domain names containing only numbers. The .at-Domain started using DNSSEC in 2011 in order to guarantee the authenticity and integrity of the Domain Name System's data.

Before August 2016, it was only possible to register .at-Domains with three or more (two for co.at, ac.at, gv.at, or.at) characters.

References

External links
 NIC.AT Website
 IANA — .at Domain Delegation Data
 Private Individuals
 .at Registrars Website

Internet in Austria
Telecommunications in Austria
Country code top-level domains
Council of European National Top Level Domain Registries members
Computer-related introductions in 1988
1988 establishments in Austria
de:Nic.at
he:סיומת אינטרנט#טבלת סיומות המדינות
sv:Toppdomän#A